The list of ship launches in 1908 includes a chronological list of some ships launched in 1908.



References

Sources

1908
Ship launches